John Tillman is a conservative activist who runs the Illinois Policy Institute (IPI), a libertarian think tank, and the American Culture Project, which seeks to advance Republican Party interests.

Career
Tillman held roles with Americans for Limited Government and the Sam Adams Alliance. He serves on the board of the National Taxpayers Union.

In 2011, Tillman won the Roe Award from the State Policy Network. The annual award "pays tribute to those in the state public policy movement whose achievements have greatly advanced the free market philosophy." He also runs the Franklin News Foundation, which obtained funding during the COVID-19 pandemic to push for opposition to COVID-19 public health restrictions.

Tillman sued the State of Illinois, alleging that it took on more debt than permissible under the state constitution, and seeking to halt payments on municipal debt. In 2020, a state appeals court allowed the lawsuit to proceed.

Tillman runs the American Culture Project, founded in 2019. The group is ostensibly a non-political non-profit and is organized as such for tax and funding disclosure purposes, but internal emails showed that the organization sought to advance the Republican Party's prospects in the 2022 elections. The organization runs Facebook pages that present themselves as non-partisan local news and community-building hubs, but which are intended to promote content that advance Republican Party interests. In communications with wealthy donors, the organization specifically states that it seeks to help the Republican Party in the 2022 elections. By 2021, the organization ran Facebook pages in Florida, Illinois, Michigan, Ohio and Virginia, as well as sought to expand to Arizona, Iowa, Minnesota, Pennsylvania, Texas and Wisconsin.

References

Living people
People from Fremont, Michigan
Activists from Illinois
Wayne State University alumni
Year of birth missing (living people)